The CNN effect is a theory in political science and media studies which states that global television networks play a significant role in determining the actions policymakers take and the outcomes of events.

History 
The 24-hour international television news channel Cable News Network (CNN) had a major impact on the conduct of United States foreign policy in the late Cold War period; CNN and its subsequent industry competitors have had a similar impact in the post–Cold War era. While the free press has, in its role as the "Fourth Estate", always had an influence on policy-making in representative democracies, proponents of the CNN effect argue that the extent, depth, and speed of the new global media have created a new species of effects qualitatively different from those that preceded them. The term's coinage reflects the role played by CNN in particular, whose coverage of many events outside the U.S. – such as the Tiananmen Square protests of 1989, the fall of Communism in eastern Europe, the first Gulf War, and the Battle of Mogadishu – was viewed as being strongly influential in bringing these images and issues to the immediate forefront of the American political consciousness. Additionally, the CNN effect has been cited as the driving force behind the U.S. intervention in the Kurdish crisis and the use of force by the U.S. Army during the Bosnia war of 1992–1995.

Research

In his research paper Clarifying the CNN Effect: An examination of Media Effects According to Type of Military Intervention, George Washington University professor Steven Livingston identifies three distinct aspects that fall under the broad term of the CNN effect. The media may function alternately or simultaneously as (1) a policy agenda-setting agent, (2) an impediment to the achievement of desired policy goals, (3) an accelerant to policy decision-making. (Italics in original). and (4) one of the common grounds of CNN effect is policy uncertainty; as policy certainty reduces, media influence increases and vice versa.

By focusing instantaneous and ongoing media coverage on a particular conflict, international incident, or diplomatic initiative, the news cycle effectively demands political attention, as governing politicians attempt to demonstrate that they are "on top of" current issues. The effect has been, according to Margaret Belknap, that "[t]he advent of real time news coverage has led to immediate public awareness and scrutiny of strategic decisions and military operations as they unfold". Deeper penetration and wider broadcast of statements and actions by public figures may increase transparency, but it can also complicate sensitive diplomatic relationships between states or force an official reaction from governments that would otherwise prefer to minimize political risk by remaining noncommittal. The information revolution and spread of global mass media through the Internet and international 24-hour news thus accelerates the policy-making process, requiring a faster tempo of decision and action to forestall the appearance of a leadership vacuum.

Former Secretary of State James Baker said of the CNN effect: "The one thing it does, is to drive policymakers to have a policy position. I would have to articulate it very quickly. You are in real-time mode. You don't have time to reflect." His former press secretary Margaret Tutwiler mirrors his sentiment: "Time for reaction is compressed. Analysis and intelligence gathering is out."

In natural disasters
While the CNN effect most commonly refers to the effect that news media have on politics and government during political conflict, its effect on decisions made during natural disasters is also noteworthy. As videos and images are broadcast worldwide immediately after or even during natural disasters, these images may convince the public to donate money or pressure governments for immediate action.

The CNN effect may have played a role in increasing aid following the Asian tsunami (2004), the Kashmir earthquake (2005), Hurricane Katrina (2005), and the Sichuan earthquake in China (2008). Following the Asian tsunami, for instance, the media "blitz" that followed this natural disaster may have helped prompt an unprecedented outpouring of donations. "By February 2005, the international community had donated $500 per person affected by the tsunami, compared to just 50 cents for each person affected by Uganda’s 18-year war."

See also
Al Jazeera effect
Broadcast journalism
News broadcasting
Media circus
Media event
Media scrum
Sensationalism
Slashdot effect
Television news
Trial by media
Yellow journalism

Notes

External links
 "CNN effect" is Not Clear-Cut, essay by Indiana University School of Law professor Fred H. Cate, in Humanitarian Affairs Review. 2002.
 "The CNN Effect": How 24-Hour News Coverage Affects Government Decisions and Public Opinion, Brookings Institution/Harvard University forum transcript. 2002.
 The "CNN Effect:" TV and Foreign Policy, Center for Defense Information America's Defense Monitor transcript. 1995.

CNN
Civil–military relations
Mass media issues
Media coverage and representation
Warfare post-1945